Ralph Fulton Lozier (January 28, 1866 – May 28, 1945) was a U.S. Representative from Missouri.

Born near Hardin, Missouri, Lozier attended the public schools. He graduated from Carrollton High School in 1883 and engaged in teaching for several years before studying law.

He was admitted to the bar in 1886 and commenced practice in Carrollton. He was also interested in agricultural pursuits and the raising of livestock. He served as city attorney of Carrollton, Missouri from 1915 to 1944 and was a delegate to the 1928 Democratic National Convention.

Lozier was elected as a Democrat to the 68th and to the five succeeding Congresses, serving from March 4, 1923 to January 3, 1935). He served as chairman of the Committee on the Census (72nd and 73rd Congresses). He was an unsuccessful candidate for renomination in 1934.

He served as judge of the circuit court of the 7th Judicial Circuit of Missouri in 1936. He resumed the practice of law with offices in Carrollton and Washington, D.C. and also engaged in agricultural pursuits in Carroll County, Missouri. He died in Kansas City, Missouri in 1945 and is interred in Oak Hill Cemetery in Carrollton.

References

1866 births
1945 deaths
Missouri state court judges
Democratic Party members of the United States House of Representatives from Missouri
People from Carrollton, Missouri